Brian J. Thom is the thirteenth bishop of the Episcopal Diocese of Idaho.

Biography
Thom attended the Oregon State University in the 1980s. He was elected Bishop of Idaho in 2008 and was consecrated on October 11, 2008 by Presiding Bishop Katharine Jefferts Schori in the Methodist Cathedral of the Rockies.

See also
 List of Episcopal bishops of the United States
 Historical list of the Episcopal bishops of the United States

External links 
Brian Thom consecrated fifteenth bishop
Boise Weekly interview

Living people
Year of birth missing (living people)
Place of birth missing (living people)
Episcopal bishops of Idaho
Oregon State University alumni